USS Aubrey Fitch (FFG-34), the twenty-sixth ship of the  of guided-missile frigates, was named for Vice-Admiral Aubrey Fitch (1883–1978), who was noted for his outstanding command work in the South Pacific during World War II.

Ordered on 23 January 1978, as a part of the FY-1978 program, Aubrey Fitch was laid down on 10 April 1981 at the Bath Iron Works, Bath, Maine. She was launched on 17 October 1981—sponsored by Mrs. Francesca Fitch Ferguson, the granddaughter of the late Admiral Fitch—and was commissioned at Bath, Maine, on 9 October 1982.

This warship was decommissioned on 12 December 1997 and stricken from the Navy's list on 3 May 1999.

1982
After commissioning, Aubrey Fitch remained at Bath for another five weeks completing her outfitting, propulsion plant testing, and sailors' training. In mid-November, she made the passage from Bath to her home port, Mayport, Florida, where she spent the remainder of 1982. She was the final "Short-Hull" Oliver Hazard Perry-class guided-missile frigate to be built, the rest were "Long-Hulls".

1983
Early in January 1983, the guided-missile frigate embarked upon her shakedown cruise to the vicinity of Guantánamo Bay, Cuba. The warship returned to Mayport during the middle of February and then launched into a series of trials, qualifications, and certifications preparatory to her final acceptance by the Navy. She completed final acceptance trials late in May and entered the yard at Bath Iron Works for a three-month, post-shakedown availability. Aubrey Fitch completed repairs and returned to Mayport in September. In October, she commenced refresher training out of Guantánamo Bay.

The guided-missile frigate was so engaged when United States military forces invaded the small Caribbean island nation of Grenada on 25 October in response to a power struggle between leftist factions that endangered the stability of the region as well as the lives of United States citizens attending the medical college there. Aubrey Fitch interrupted refresher training to conduct patrols in defense of the base at Guantánamo Bay against possible hostile action by Cuba as a result of the conflict in Grenada where Americans found themselves fighting Cuban "advisors" and "construction workers".

Demands attendant to the continuing American presence in Grenada, however, overtook the experiment and sent Aubrey Fitch and her two consorts south to the tiny republic. Duty in the waters adjacent to Grenada lasted until mid-December when the warship returned to Mayport.

1984
Aubrey Fitch began 1984 in her home port. Later in January, she embarked upon a normal schedule of training operations in the West Indies. That employment occupied her through the month of May and into June. On 22 June, the guided missile frigate put to sea to become a unit of NATO's Standing Naval Force, Atlantic, based at Plymouth, England. That deployment included visits to a number of ports in northern Europe as well as training evolutions in the Baltic Sea. Early in the fall of 1984, the NATO force visited American waters and made calls at Charleston, Savannah, and New Orleans. Late in November, the warships visited Aubrey Fitchs home port in Florida. Early in December, the NATO force headed back to Europe, leaving Aubrey Fitch at Mayport.

1985
The warship opened 1985 much the same way as she did 1984. After concluding holiday leave and upkeep at Mayport during the first half of January, she returned to sea for the usual training exercises, equipment operation certifications, and ASW helicopter landing qualifications. These and similar evolutions alternated with periods in port for routine upkeep and availability occupied her time during the first five months of the year.

Near the end of June, she put to sea for special operations off the west coast of the Isthmus of Panama. She transited the Panama Canal and then operated from PSA Panama International Terminal during July, August, and part of September. After passing back through the canal in mid-September, Aubrey Fitch arrived back at Mayport on the 21st. Repairs took up the remainder of September as well as October and November. She concluded her restricted availability with sea trials on 5 and 6 December and, after a brief round trip to Charleston and back, settled into the usual year-end holiday routine.

1986
The relative inactivity of holiday standdown carried over into the first three weeks of 1986. On 21 January, Aubrey Fitch put to sea for a week of ASW training in the Bahama Islands. On 28 January, she interrupted her return voyage when the  disintegrated soon after launch. From her position just 50 miles southeast of Cape Canaveral Aubrey Fitch rushed to the scene of the tragedy and began recovering debris. She collected several tons of material which she later delivered to Cape Canaveral to be inspected as a part of the investigation into the cause of the disaster. From Cape Canaveral the guided-missile frigate returned to Mayport and remained there until the second week in February. On 10 February, Aubrey Fitch resumed training operations out of Mayport, and she continued so employed until the beginning of April at which time the warship began preparations to deploy to the Persian Gulf.

She and her traveling companions then laid in a course that took them across the Atlantic Ocean and the Mediterranean Sea, through the Suez Canal, and around the Arabian Peninsula to the Strait of Hormuz. Aubrey Fitch and her consorts arrived at Bahrain in the Persian Gulf on 8 July. The guided-missile frigate spent the next four months conducting patrols and escorting merchant ships in the strategic–and troubled–waters of the Persian Gulf, the Gulf of Oman, and the northern portion of the Arabian Sea. No untoward events marred her sojourn in the region, and she concluded her assignment on 30 October by turning her responsibilities over to the destroyer . Retracing her outward-bound voyage via the Red Sea, the Suez Canal, the Mediterranean Sea, and the Atlantic Ocean, Aubrey Fitch steamed into Mayport on 4 December. Post-deployment standdown took up the remainder of 1986.

1987–1997
Over the next ten years, Aubrey Fitch continued to the Middle East and the West Indies. During a 1988 deployment to the Persian Gulf, the frigate participated in Operation Earnest Will, during which she conducted escort missions to protect Kuwaiti merchant tankers from attack during the Iran–Iraq War. In December 1990 the warship conducted counter-narcotics patrols in the Caribbean and eastern Pacific, and received a Joint Meritorious Unit Award for her efforts. In July 1991, Aubrey Fitch hosted the Soviet guided missile destroyer  during a visit to Mayport.
 
In August 1991, following the invasion of Kuwait by Saddam Hussein's Iraqi Army, the frigate surged to the Middle East to participate in Maritime Interception Operations (MIO) in the northern Red Sea. Designed to cut the flow of supplies and equipment to Iraq in support of United Nations' economic sanctions, Aubrey Fitch conducted 243 merchant ship boardings and inspected over 3 million tons of cargo. The ship received a Navy Meritorious Unit Commendation for this performance.
 
In February 1993 the frigate participated in Operation Able Manner, in support of migration interdiction efforts off Haiti, receiving the Coast Guard Special Operations Service Ribbon for developing baseline procedures for conducting mass lifesaving operations.
 
In 1994, Aubrey Fitch carried out two deployments to Haiti in support of Operation Uphold Democracy, where the crew boarded over 50 ships to enforce economic sanctions against the government and provided security and search-and-rescue support for operations within Port-au-Prince Harbor.
 
In the summer of 1995, the frigate sailed to Europe both to conduct NATO training exercises and to participate in the 50th anniversary commemoration of the Battle of the Atlantic and the end of the war in Europe.
 
Aubrey Fitch spent March through July 1995 touring Western Europe, including Bermuda; Brest, France; Rota, Barcelona and Ibiza, Spain; Casablanca, Morocco; Gibraltar, Portsmouth & Liverpool, UK; Lisbon, Portugal; Amsterdam, Netherlands; Derry & Portrush, Northern Ireland and Rosyth, Scotland.

From September 1996 to March 1997, Aubrey Fitch conducted her last operational deployment as part of Standing Naval Force Atlantic, during which she visited fourteen ports ranging between Gydnia, Poland west to Faslane, Scotland and south to Lisbon, Portugal.

Aubrey Fitch was decommissioned on 12 December 1997 and towed to the former Philadelphia Naval Yard as part of the inactive reserve fleet. She had the shortest active career of any of the US Navy's Oliver Hazard Perry-class ships at 15 years, and was stricken on 3 May 1999, just two years later into unmaintained (Category-X) status to await scrap sale. Aubrey Fitch was transferred to Metro Machine Corp. for scrapping, on 26 March 2004.

Aubrey Fitch (FFG-34) was the first ship with this name in the U.S. Navy.

References

External links

hazegray.org/danfs/: USS Aubrey Fitch
MaritimeQuest USS Aubrey Fitch FFG-34
GlobalSecurity.org FFG-27

 

1981 ships
Oliver Hazard Perry-class frigates of the United States Navy
Ships built in Bath, Maine
Cold War frigates and destroyer escorts of the United States